This is a list of Canadian films which were released in 1982:

See also
 1982 in Canada
 1982 in Canadian television

1982
1982 in Canadian cinema
Canada